Lance Corporal Cecil Reginald Noble VC (4 June 1891 − 13 March 1915) was a British Army soldier and a posthumous English recipient of the Victoria Cross (VC), the highest and most prestigious award for gallantry in the face of the enemy that can be awarded to British and Commonwealth forces. He was killed at the Battle of Neuve Chapelle during the First World War.

Noble was born in Bournemouth, then part of Hampshire, the son of Frederick Noble, a decorator, and his wife Hannah nee Smith. The family lived in Capstone Road and he attended St Clement's Elemenary School, and followed his father in working as a decorator. He disliked his given forename and was known by friends and family as Tommy.

He enlisted in the British Army Rifle Brigade in 1910. When he was 23 years old, and an Acting Corporal in the 2nd Battalion, The Rifle Brigade (Prince Consort's Own), on the Western Front the following deed took place for which he was posthumously awarded the Victoria Cross.

On 12 March 1915 at Neuve Chapelle, France, when the advance of the battalion was impeded by wire entanglements and by very severe machine-gun fire, Corporal Noble and another man (Harry Daniels) voluntarily rushed in front and succeeded in cutting the wires. They were both wounded, and Corporal Noble later died of his injuries. Daniels survived to receive his Victoria Cross and later rose to the rank of lieutenant-colonel.

Noble was buried at Longuenesse Souvenir Cemetery, two miles south of Saint-Omer, France, in plot I, row A, grave 57.

He was posthumously awarded the Victoria Cross for most conspicuous bravery on 29 April 1915. Source: Military records.

See also

Monuments to Courage (David Harvey, 1999)
The Register of the Victoria Cross (This England, 1997)
VCs of the First World War - The Western Front 1915 (Peter F. Batchelor & Christopher Matson, 1999)

References

1891 births
1915 deaths
Military personnel from Bournemouth
Rifle Brigade soldiers
British Army personnel of World War I
British military personnel killed in World War I
British World War I recipients of the Victoria Cross
British Army recipients of the Victoria Cross
Burials in France